Agdistis hartigi is a moth in the family Pterophoridae. It is known from southern Spain, Italy (Sardinia and Sicily), Greece and Tunisia.

The wingspan is about 17 mm.

Adults are on wing from June to July and from September to October.

References

Agdistinae
Moths of Europe
Moths described in 1973